Fu-Schnickens were an American hip-hop trio from 1988 to 1995, based in Brooklyn, New York.

History 
Fu-Schnickens was composed of Chip Fu (Roderick Roachford), Moc Fu (Joe Jones), and Poc Fu (Lennox Maturine). Fu stood for unity and schnicken was a made-up word that meant "coalition". The three friends from East Flatbush, Brooklyn, first gained attention after performing at a hip hop event at Howard University, after which the group was signed by Jive Records. The group's debut single, "Ring the Alarm", entered the top ten on the Billboard Hot Rap Tracks chart in 1992, which sparked anticipation for the group's debut album, F.U. Don't Take It Personal, and also inadvertently immortalized and ignited a new-found popularity for the original "Ring the Alarm", the signature tune of dancehall reggae singjay Tenor Saw from 1985, which the group sampled to create its track of the same name. Furthermore, with the hit singles "La Schmoove" (featuring Phife Dawg of A Tribe Called Quest) and "True Fu-Schnick," the album reached the top 20 on the Top R&B/Hip-Hop Albums chart  and was certified for gold-level sales by the RIAA.

In 1993, Fu-Schnickens began work on its second album. The group recorded a fast-paced song called "What's Up, Doc?" which featured a sample of Bugs Bunny saying his famous catchphrase. But the group could not get sample clearance from Warner Bros. so the song was shelved. Meanwhile, the then-rookie NBA star Shaquille O'Neal was a media sensation. In many interviews, he talked about his love of hip hop music and stated that the Fu-Schnickens were his favorite hip hop group. This prompted the group to contact O'Neal for a collaboration. O'Neal recorded a verse that was added on to the already-recorded "What's Up, Doc?" with the group and O'Neal saying "What's up, doc?" to replace the Bugs Bunny sample. Although the group had not yet completed work on its album, the song was quickly released as a single to capitalize on O'Neal's popularity. The single was a top-40 hit in the summer of 1993, which briefly propelled the group into the mainstream. The group's second album, Nervous Breakdown, did not arrive until 1994.

The group took part in a huge performance on the finale of The Arsenio Hall Show, alongside the likes of KRS-One, Wu-Tang Clan, Naughty by Nature, MC Lyte, Guru, Mad Lion, Yo-Yo, Das EFX, CL Smooth, and A Tribe Called Quest.

Fu-Schnickens is also notable for its many references to martial arts films and Asian culture before Wu-Tang Clan, which eventually helped make such references popular in hip hop music.

Discography

Studio albums

Compilation albums

Singles

As lead artist

References

Notes

Citations

External links 

 Fu-Schnickens Music Videos

African-American musical groups
Jive Records artists
Hip hop groups from New York City
Musical groups from Brooklyn
American musical trios
People from Flatbush, Brooklyn